{{Infobox election
| election_name = 2022 Santa Catarina state election
| country = Santa Catarina
| party_name = yes
| type = presidential
| vote_type = Popular
| turnout = 81.54% (first round)82.56% (second round)
| opinion_polls = #Opinion polls
| ongoing = no
| previous_election = 2018 Santa Catarina gubernatorial election
| previous_year = 2018
| next_election = 2026 Santa Catarina gubernatorial election
| next_year = 2026
| election_date =  (first round)   (second round)
| module = {{Infobox election
| embed              = yes
| election_name      = Gubernatorial election
| type               = presidential
| ongoing            = no
| alliance_name      = no
| image_size         = 130x130px

| image1             = Senador Jorginho Mello (cropped).jpg
| candidate1         = Jorginho Mello
| party1             = Liberal Party (Brazil, 2006)
| alliance1          = None
| running_mate1      = Delegada Marilisa
| popular_vote1      = 2,983,949
| percentage1        = 55.27%

| image2             = CMMPV - Comissões Mistas Medidas Provisórias (27099588229) (cropped).jpg
| candidate2         = Décio Lima
| party2             = Workers' Party (Brazil)
| alliance2          = Democratic Front of Santa Catarina
| running_mate2      = Bia Vargas
| popular_vote2      = 1,237,016
| percentage2        = 44.73%

| module             = {{Infobox legislative election
| embed              = yes
| election_name      = Parliamentary election
| ongoing            = no
| seats_for_election = All 94 seats of the Legislative Assembly

| heading1           = Legislative Assembly
| leader1            = Ana Caroline Campagnolo
| party1             = Liberal Party (Brazil, 2006)
| percentage1        = 21.81
| seats1             = 11
| last_election1     = 3

| leader2            = Antídio Lunelli
| party2             = Brazilian Democratic Movement
| percentage2        = 12.55
| seats2             = 6
| last_election2     = 9

| leader3            = Luciane Carminatti
| party3             = Workers' Party (Brazil)
| percentage3        = 10.87
| seats3             = 4
| last_election3     = 4

| leader4            = Mário Motta
| party4             = Social Democratic Party (Brazil, 2011)
| percentage4        = 7.29
| seats4             = 3
| last_election4     = 5

| leader5            = Zé Milton
| party5             = Progressistas
| percentage5        = 6.96
| seats5             = 3
| last_election5     = 3

| leader6            = Jair Miotto
| party6             = Brazil Union
| percentage6        = 6.60
| seats6             = 3
| last_election6     = 0

| leader7            = Paulinha
| party7             = Podemos (Brazil)
| percentage7        = 5.89
| seats7             = 3
| last_election7     = 0

| leader8            = Marcos Vieira
| party8             = Brazilian Social Democracy Party
| percentage8        = 5.24
| seats8             = 2
| last_election8     = 2

| leader9            = Sérgio Motta
| party9             = Republicans (Brazil)
| percentage9        = 4.06
| seats9             = 1
| last_election9     = 1

| leader10           = Matheus Cadorin
| party10            = New Party (Brazil)
| percentage10       = 3.39
| seats10            = 1
| last_election10    = 1

| leader11           = Delegado Egídio Ferrari 
| party11            = Brazilian Labour Party (current)
| percentage11       = 2.40
| seats11            = 1
| last_election11    = 1

| leader12           = Marquito
| party12            = Socialism and Liberty Party
| percentage12       = 2.06
| seats12            = 1
| last_election12    = 0

| leader13           = Rodrigo Minotto
| party13            = Democratic Labour Party (Brazil)
| percentage13       = 2.04
| seats13            = 1
| last_election13    = 2

| module             = {{Infobox election
| embed              = yes
| election_name      = Senatorial election
| type               = Senate
| vote_type          = Popular
| ongoing            = no
| alliance_name      = no
| image_size         = 130x130px

| election_date      =   
| opinion_polls      = 2022 São Paulo gubernatorial election#Senator
| title              = Senator

| image1             = Senadores da 57ª Legislatura (52689452150).jpg
| candidate1         = Jorge Seif
| party1             = Liberal Party (Brazil, 2006)
| alliance1          = None
| popular_vote1      = 1,484,110
| percentage1        = 39.79%

| image2             = Raimundo Colombo, Gov SC 2016 (cropped).jpg
| candidate2         = Raimundo Colombo
| party2             = Social Democratic Party (Brazil, 2011)
| alliance2          = Let's Work
| popular_vote2      = 608,213
| percentage2        = 16.30%

| image3             = Foto oficial de Dário Berger.jpg
| candidate3         = Dário
| party3             = Brazilian Socialist Party
| alliance3          = Democratic Front of Santa Catarina"
| popular_vote3      = 605.258
| percentage3        = 16.23%

| map_image          = Mapa - Eleição ao Senado de Santa Catarina (2022).svg
| map_size           = 250px
| map_caption        = Candidate with the most votes per municipality (645):
  Tied

| before_election    = Dário Berger
| before_party       = Brazilian Socialist Party
| after_election     = Jorge Seif
| after_party        = Liberal Party (Brazil, 2006)
}}
}}

| map_image          = Santa Catarina 2022.svg
| map_size           = 250px
| map_caption        = Candidate with the most votes per municipality in the 2nd round (295):

| title              = Governor
| before_election    = Carlos Moisés
| before_party       = Republicans (Brazil)
| after_election     = Jorginho Mello
| after_party        = Liberal Party (Brazil, 2006)
}}
}}

The 2022 Santa Catarina state election took place in the state of Santa Catarina, Brazil on 2 October 2022 and 30 October 2022 (second round, if necessary). Voters elected a Governor, Vice Governor, one Senator, 70 representatives for the Chamber of Deputies, and 94 Legislative Assembly members. The incumbent Governor, Rodrigo Garcia, of the Brazilian Social Democracy Party (PSDB), was eligible for a second term and ran for reelection.

Garcia was elected Vice Governor in 2018 and took office as the governor on April 1, 2022, with the resignation of the incumbent João Doria, due to his then candidacy for the Presidency of Republic, which he ended up withdrawing on May 23, 2022. For the election to the Federal Senate, the seat occupied by José Serra (PSDB) since 2014, was at dispute, and the incumbent said that he will run for a seat at the Chamber of Deputies.

 Electoral calendar 

 Legislative Assembly 
The result of the last state election and the current situation in the Legislative Assembly of São Paulo is given below:

 Gubernatorial candidates 
The party conventions began on July 20 and will continue until August 5th. The following political parties have already confirmed their candidacies. Political parties have until August 15, 2022, to formally register their candidates.

 Candidates in runoff 

 Candidates failing to make runoff 

 Senatorial candidates 
The party conventions began on July 20 and will continue until August 5th. The following political parties have already confirmed their candidacies. Political parties have until August 15, 2022, to formally register their candidates.

 Confirmed candidates 

 Rejected candidacies 

 Sergio Moro (UNIÃO) - Federal judge of the Federal Regional Court of the 4th Region (TRF-4) 1996–2018 and Minister of Justice and Public Security in the Jair Bolsonaro's cabinet (2019–2020). He was a potential candidate for the Federal Senate in the state of São Paulo, but the Regional Electoral Court of São Paulo (TRE-SP) rejected the transfer of voting domicile, on the grounds that the former judge didn't have a professional relationship with the State. He can appeal to the Superior Electoral Court (TSE), but decided to run for the Senate representing the state of Paraná.
 Paulo Skaf (Republicanos) - President of CIESP (2007–2021) and President of FIESP (2004–2021). He was one of the possible names for the Senate race in the state of São Paulo. However, the Republicans convention decided to support Marcos Pontes' candidacy.
 Nise Yamaguchi (PROS) - Oncologist and immunologist, university professor. Her party officially endorsed Fernando Haddad and Márcio França, joining the Together for São Paulo coalition. Yamaguchi filed a lawsuit in the electoral justice for an independent candidacy, awaiting decision.

 Withdrawn candidacies 

 José Luiz Datena (PSC) - TV presenter and journalist. He announced the withdrawal of his candidacy for the Federal Senate and said that his decision was influenced by attacks from radical groups.
 Arthur Weintraub (PMB) - Special advisor to the Presidency of the Republic (2019–20) and Secretary of Multidimensional Security at the Organization of American States (OAS) 2020–2022. He withdrew his candidacy for the Senate and decided to be a candidate for Federal Deputy.
 Cristiane Brasil (PTB) - Federal Deputy from Rio de Janeiro (2015–19). She withdrew her candidacy for the Senate, decided to be a candidate for Federal Deputy and endorsed former minister Marcos Pontes (PL).
 Heni Ozi Cukier (PODE) - State Deputy of São Paulo (since 2019). With the formalization of the national alliance between Podemos, Brazilian Democratic Movement and the Brazilian Social Democracy Party, Cukier ended up losing space on Rodrigo Garcia's ticket, who preferred to accommodate other names of allied parties. With this scenario, the deputy ended up giving up his candidacy to run for the Chamber of Deputies.

 Debate list 
For the first time in the Brazilian general elections since 1989, television and radio stations, newspapers and news websites group themselves into pools to hold gubernatorial debates, by request of the campaigns in order to reduce the number of debates scheduled for the 2022 elections.

As of 29 August 2022, the following presidential debates were held or scheduled (times in UTC−03:00):

 Opinion polls 

 Governor 

 First round 

The first round is scheduled to take place on 2 October 2022.

2022

2021

 Second round 
The second round (if necessary) is scheduled to take place on 30 October 2022.

2022Haddad vs. Tarcísio de FreitasHaddad vs. GarciaTarcísio de Freitas vs. Garcia''

Hypothetical scenarios with Márcio França

Senator 

2022

2021

Results

Governor

Senator

Chamber of Deputies

Legislative Assembly

Notes

References 

Sao Paolo
2022
2022 elections in Brazil